is a Japanese fantasy light novel series written by Suzu Enoshima and illustrated by Eihi. It was serialized online between August and November 2018 on the user-generated novel publishing website Shōsetsuka ni Narō, and all 47 chapters were later released on the Kakuyomu website in December 2019. It was later acquired by Fujimi Shobo, who have published two volumes between April and August 2019 under their Kadokawa Books imprint. The light novel is licensed in North America by J-Novel Club. A manga adaptation with art by Rumiwo Sakaki has been serialized in Enterbrain's josei manga magazine B's Log Comic since June 2019. It has been collected in six tankōbon volumes. An anime television series adaptation by Tezuka Productions premiered in January 2023.

Plot 
Broadcasting club members Aoto Endo and Shihono Kobayashi decide to play A Magical Romance, an otome game following the adventures of the protagonist Fiene as she romances her capture targets while fighting against the villainess, Lieselotte Riefenstahl, who is eventually consumed by darkness and tragedy in all of the game's routes. Aoto, having read the game's supplementary material, believes Lieselotte to be misunderstood, claiming she is instead a tsundere that has trouble expressing her feelings. Aoto and Shihono play the game while each providing color and play-by-play commentary respectively, only for Prince Siegwald Fitzenhagen, Lieselotte's fiancé, to hear their words and interpret them as the word of god. As Aoto and Shihono continue providing commentary on Lieselotte, Siegwald begins understanding her feelings and thus avoiding the dark fate she faces as the misunderstood villainess, leading to drastic changes to the fate of their world.

Characters

Media

Light novel
The series by Suzu Enoshima, originally serialized on the user-generated novel publishing website Shōsetsuka ni Narō from August 11 to November 3, 2018, was later made available on Kakuyomu in December 2019. It was also later acquired by Fujimi Shobo, who have published two light novel volumes with illustrations by Eihi between April 10 and August 9, 2019 under their Kadokawa Books imprint. An extra volume was released on December 9, 2022. In September 2021, J-Novel Club announced that they had licensed the light novel in North America.

Manga
A manga adaptation with art by Rumiwo Sakaki has been serialized in Enterbrain's josei manga magazine B's Log Comic since June 5, 2019. It has been collected in six tankōbon volumes. In January 2023, J-Novel Club announced that they had also licensed the manga.

Anime
On December 24, 2021, an anime adaptation was announced. It was later confirmed to be a television series adaptation produced by Tezuka Productions and directed by Fumihiro Yoshimura, with Tomoko Konparu overseeing the series' scripts, Miyuki Katayama designing the characters, and Tatsuhiko Saiki, Natsumi Tabuchi, Sayaka Aoki, Junko Nakajima, and Kanade Sakuma composing the music. It premiered on January 7, 2023, on the Animeism programming block on MBS and other affiliates. At Anime NYC 2022, Sentai Filmworks announced that they licensed the series, and will be streaming it on Hidive.

Reception
The series had over 500,000 copies in circulation as of December 2021.

Notes

References

External links
  at Kakuyomu 
  
  
  
 Anime Episode 1 - DMM Pictures YouTube Channel 
 

2019 Japanese novels
2023 anime television series debuts
Anime and manga based on light novels
Animeism
Comedy-drama anime and manga
Enterbrain manga
Fantasy anime and manga
Fujimi Shobo
J-Novel Club books
Japanese webcomics
Josei manga
Kadokawa Dwango franchises
Light novels
Light novels first published online
Romantic comedy anime and manga
Sentai Filmworks
Shōsetsuka ni Narō
Tezuka Productions
Webcomics in print